Maria Elizabeth Holland (1836 - 1878) was a South African botanical artist and plant collector.

Early life
She was the eldest of fourteen children and was married to John Holland of Port Elizabeth. Her grandfather was  Jacob Glen Cuyler.

Career
She contributed to volume I (1860) of William Henry Harvey's Thesaurus capensis, and received praise from Harvey for her "well-executed outline drawings".

References
Notes

Sources

External links

Collection of Drawings of South African Plants, Holland collection

1836 births
1878 deaths
19th-century South African botanists
South African women botanists
Botanical illustrators
19th-century South African women scientists
Cuyler family
Schuyler family